Edina Gallovits-Hall and Anabel Medina Garrigues are the defending champions, but Medina Garrigues decided to participate instead at the 2012 Qatar Ladies Open. Edina Gallovits-Hall choose to participate with Karin Knapp, but they lost in the semifinals.

Eva Birnerová and Alexandra Panova won the title, they defeated Mandy Minella and Stefanie Vögele in the final, 6–2, 6–2.

Seeds

Draw

Draw

References
 Main Draw

Copa Sony Ericsson Colsanitas - Doubles
2012 Doubles